The Great Basin Landscape Conservation Cooperative is a  partnership of the United States government with other agencies to address the challenges of climate change in the Great Basin.

Among its projects are the 
Intermountain West Joint Venture
Great Basin Restoration Initiative
Desert Fish Habitat Partnership

among its partners are the
Nature Conservancy
Cooperative Sagebrush Initiative
Great Basin Environmental Program

There are 21 other similar partnerships in other regions.

See also
Conservation development
Blue Ridge Berryessa Natural Area
Georgia Land Conservation Program
Saline Wetlands Conservation Partnership
Landscape Conservation Cooperatives

References

External links
Great Basin Landscape Conservation Cooperative 
 Landscape Conservation Cooperatives

Nature conservation organizations based in the United States
Environmental research institutes
x